The Buffalo Riot of 1862 was a civil disturbance on the afternoon of August 12, 1862 by Irish and German stevedores against local dock bosses.  The rioters demanded increased pay and prevented others from working at the old rates.  They initially overpowered police, seriously injuring the chief of police and other officers, but were forced to surrender after police opened fire, wounding two. Although the mayor had called for the New York State Militia, police arrested the ringleaders before the militia was needed.

References
 

1862 riots
1862 in the United States
Labor disputes in New York (state)
Riots and civil disorder in New York (state)
Maritime labor disputes in the United States
Riots and civil unrest during the American Civil War
1862 in New York (state)
Labor-related riots in the United States
August 1862 events